The 1994–95 season was Atlético Madrid's 64th season since foundation in 1903 and the club's 60th season in La Liga, the top league of Spanish football. Atlético competed in La Liga and the Copa del Rey.

Squad

Out on loan

Transfers

In

Out

Results

La Liga

League table

Position by round

Matches

Copa del Rey

Third round

Fourth round

Round of 16

Quarter-finals

Squad statistics

Appearances and goals

Disciplinary record

References

External links

 Official website

Atlético Madrid seasons
Atlético Madrid